The Iglesia de Cristo Pinares del Nort is a church in Guatemala City, Guatemala. It is located in Zone 18 of the city.

See also
Roman Catholic Archdiocese of Santiago de Guatemala

References

External links
Guatemala Directory of the churches of Christ

Roman Catholic churches in Guatemala
Buildings and structures in Guatemala City